Bezmer is a village (село) in southeastern Bulgaria, located in the Tundzha Municipality of the Yambol Province.

References

Villages in Yambol Province